Hunan First Normal University, founded in 1903, is a university located in Yuelu District, Changsha, Hunan Province, China.

Hunan First Normal University covers a total area of 1346 mu, with more than 420,000 square meters of floor space. The university is divided into 10 colleges.

As of 2021, the Best Chinese Universities Ranking, also known as the "Shanghai Ranking", placed Hunan First Normal University at 394th in China.

Leaders 
The President (校長) is the highest academic official of Hunan First Normal University. The President is the chief executive, appointed by the Ministry of Education of the People's Republic of China (MOE).

After the founding of People's Republic of China, the responsibilities were separated into two posts, the President and Communist Party Secretary.

The President position is currently held by Xiao Xiangyu, who formerly served as President of Jishou University from August 2011 until December 2013.

Presidents

Communist Party Secretaries

Noted alumni 

 Mao Zedong
 Cai Hesen
 He Shuheng
 Xia Xi

References

External links

 

 
Teachers colleges in China
Universities and colleges in Changsha
Educational institutions established in 1903
1903 establishments in China
Universities and colleges in Hunan
Yuelu District